Hurskainen is a surname. Notable people with the surname include:

Arvi Hurskainen (born 1941), Finnish academic
Henri Hurskainen (born 1986), Swedish badminton player
Lassi Hurskainen (born 1987), Finnish footballer

Surnames of Scandinavian origin